The Petroleum News is a weekly newspaper based in Anchorage, Alaska. Prior to April 6, 2003, Petroleum News was known as Petroleum News Alaska. The name change came as a result of the gradual addition of more Canadian and Continental U.S. petroleum news to the weekly paper, and especially coverage of the proposed Mackenzie Valley Pipeline. The Petroleum News is the only standalone oil and gas publication in Alaska.

External links
 

Companies based in Anchorage, Alaska
Newspapers published in Alaska
Petroleum in Alaska